Melophorus (meaning "honey carrier") is a genus of ants in the subfamily Formicinae and the sole member of the tribe Melophorini. The genus is endemic to Australia, where its species are common in arid and semiarid areas.

Species

Melophorus aeneovirens (Lowne, 1865)
Melophorus anderseni Agosti, 1998
Melophorus bagoti Lubbock, 1883
Melophorus biroi Forel, 1907
Melophorus bruneus McAreavey, 1949
Melophorus constans Santschi, 1928
Melophorus curtus Forel, 1902
Melophorus fieldi Forel, 1910
Melophorus fulvihirtus Clark, 1941
Melophorus hirsutus Forel, 1902
Melophorus insularis Wheeler, 1934
Melophorus iridescens (Emery, 1887)
Melophorus laticeps Wheeler, 1915
Melophorus ludius Forel, 1902
Melophorus majeri Agosti, 1998
Melophorus marius Forel, 1910
Melophorus mjobergi Forel, 1915
Melophorus omniparens Forel, 1915
Melophorus pillipes Santschi, 1919
Melophorus potteri McAreavey, 1947
Melophorus scipio Forel, 1915
Melophorus turneri Forel, 1910
Melophorus wheeleri Forel, 1910

See also
Honeypot ant

References

External links

Formicinae
Ant genera
Hymenoptera of Australia